The Francis D. Alling House is a historic house at 323 East Avenue in Tallmadge, Ohio. Owner Francis D. Alling, a local builder and craftsman, built the house for himself in 1875 after living in an older house on the property for over a decade. Alling designed the house in the Italianate style, which he also used for several other houses in the area. The two-story house features a tower at its southeast corner which reaches a story above the main house and is topped by a mansard roof. The house's design also includes a full front porch with a bracketed cornice, a projecting bay, and bracketed eaves. Three outbuildings are present on the property: a bank barn that predates the house, an outhouse, and a modern garage.

The house was listed in the National Register on November 30, 1987.

Notes 

Houses on the National Register of Historic Places in Ohio
Houses in Summit County, Ohio
National Register of Historic Places in Summit County, Ohio
Houses completed in 1875
Italianate architecture in Ohio